Eucreadium is a genus of trematodes in the family Opecoelidae.

Species
Eucreadium cameronii Gupta, 1963
Eucreadium daccai Bashirullah & Elahi, 1972
Eucreadium eutropiichthyius Dayal, 1942
Eucreadium gangi Pandey, 1970
Eucreadium hemlatae Gupta & Govind, 1983
Eucreadium jhingrani Srivastava & Singh, 1967
Eucreadium kulpaharensis Agarwal & Agrawal, 1985
Eucreadium pandeyi Srivastava, Saxena & Kumar, 1983
Eucreadium thapari Agarwal & Kumar, 1980
Eucreadium varanasi Agarwal & Varma, 1972

References

Opecoelidae
Plagiorchiida genera